Gideon Falls is an American horror comic book series created by writer Jeff Lemire and artist Andrea Sorrentino, published by Image Comics. The series ran for 27 issues from March 2018–December 2020.

Plot
The lives of a reclusive young man obsessed with a conspiracy in the city's trash, and a washed-up Catholic priest arriving in a small town full of dark secrets, become intertwined around the mysterious legend of The Black Barn, an otherworldly building that is alleged to have appeared in both the city and the small town, throughout history, bringing death and madness in its wake.

Publication history
Gideon Falls was first announced in October 2017, in advance of New York Comic Con. Lemire set out to create an intelligent horror story, not one driven by gore, but by exploring the nature of evil. Sorrentino described the central character, Norton Sinclair, as inheriting the worst from himself and Lemire - nihilism from Sorrentino and obsession from Lemire. Norton is based on a character Lemire created in 1996 for a short film during film school in Toronto. The Black Barn from the series was somewhat inspired by the Black Lodge from Twin Peaks, though Lemire assured readers that he was going somewhere very different with the concept. The story came from two separate stories that weren't working on their own, but finally clicked when Lemire put them together.

The series concluded at issue #27 in December 2020 with an 80-page issue.

Issues

Awards

Television adaptation
Gideon Falls was picked up for a television series by Hivemind Productions in June 2018. Lemire and Sorrentino will serve as executive producers alongside Jason Brown, Sean Daniel, Kathy Lingg, and Dinesh Shamdasani. In October 2019, James Wan, along with his Atomic Monster Productions partner Michael Clear, has joined as executive producer. Lemire has assured readers that despite television development, the comic will remain his primary focus.

References

External links
 Gideon Falls page on Image Comics

2018 comics debuts
Image Comics titles
Horror comics
2018 in comics
Comics by Jeff Lemire